Catherine d'Etchéa, pen name of Paulette Boudet, (1920 – 2 March 2007) was a French writer, laureate of the Prix du Livre Inter in 1975.

Selected works 
 1975: Des demeures et des gens, short stories, Éditions Gallimard, Prix du Livre Inter
 1976: Personnes publiques, vies privées, Éditions de la Table ronde
 1988: Ce combat n'est pas le tien, Fayard,

External links 
 Catherine d'Etchéa on the site of Éditions Gallimard
 L'écrivain Paulette Boudet s'est éteinte le 22 février on La Croix (2 March 2007)
 Paulette Boudet on Éditions des Béatitudes

1920 births
2007 deaths
20th-century French women writers
20th-century French non-fiction writers
French Roman Catholic writers
Prix du Livre Inter winners